Chronicle Man is the ninth studio album by the northern California rock band the Mother Hips. Released in 2014, Chronicle Man unearths eleven tracks that were recorded in the mid-1990's during the Mother Hips' tenure on Rick Rubin's label American Recordings. A stack of 2" audio tape was discovered in 2009 in a Los Angeles basement and was sent back to the Mother Hips, who then went through the tapes to form the eleven tracks on Chronicle Man.

Track listing
 "Desert Song" – 3:22
 "El Pancho Villa" – 3:50
 "You Can't Win" – 3:10
 "St. Andrew" – 4:13
 "Loup Garou" – 4:14
 "Desert Moon" – 1:21
 "Headache to Headache" – 4:33
 "The Flood" – 5:13
 "Chronicle Man" – 2:54
 "Barefoot Sea Chantey" – 2:15
 "Rich Little Girl" – 7:20

Personnel
 Tim Bluhm – guitar, vocals, keys
 Greg Loiacono – guitar, vocals, keys
 Isaac Parsons – bass
 Mike Wofchuck – drums
 John Hofer – drums
 Danny Eisenberg – keyboards

References 

2014 albums
The Mother Hips albums